Root Insurance is a recently founded car insurance company looking to penetrate into the well-established car insurance market. Root Insurance is powered entirely by their mobile app. It is licensed in 44 states but currently operates in 34 of those states. Root Insurance customers are incentivized through downloading their app and completing certain requirements.

About 
Root Insurance headquarters are based out of Columbus, Ohio. Root Insurance largest markets are Texas, Georgia, Colorado, Pennsylvania, Louisiana, Utah and Nevada.  Root Insurance remains committed to embedded insurance, which made up for 41% of the companies new writing in Q4 of 2022 via Carvana. As of December 31, 2022, Root had 220,354 policies in force and $762.1 million in cash and cash equivalents.

History  
Root Insurance was founded in March, 2015 by Alex Timm and Dan Manges. In 2021, Dan Manges co-founder retired as CTO but remained a consultant to the company through December, 2021.

In August, 2021, Root announced a partnership deal with Carvana to develop personalized auto insurance for Carvana’s car-buying platform. The deal, formed around a $126 million investment fueled by Carvana for a 5% stake in Root initially, including warrants that can be exercised at certain stages when thresholds are struck. The collaboration uses both companies technology to develop an embedded experience for customers when purchasing a car with Carvana. 

In January, 2022, Root closed on a $300 million five-year term loan with BlackRock. The maturity of this term loan is January 27, 2027. On March 23, 2022, long-time Root Insurance C-Suite executive, Daniel Rosenthal resignation will take effect.

Sponsorships
In December, 2020, 23XI Racing announced that Root will be one of the sponsors of the No. 23 Toyota Camry driven by Bubba Wallace. As of January, 2023, Root is no longer sponsoring 23XI Racing or Bubba Wallace.

References

External links 
 

Auto insurance in the United States
Insurance companies of the United States
Financial services companies established in 2015
2015 establishments in Ohio
Financial services companies of the United States
Companies based in the Columbus, Ohio metropolitan area
American companies established in 2015
2020 initial public offerings